Birayma Kuran Kan (ruled c.1488–c.1492) was the ninth ruler, or Burba, of the Jolof Empire.

References

15th-century monarchs in Africa
Year of birth missing
1492 deaths